Shana (Japanese: 紗那村, Shana-mura) is a village in Shana District, both of which are located in the disputed Northern Territories area of the Kuril Islands. It is currently administered by Russia as part of Yuzhno-Kurilsky District in Sakhalin Oblast, although Japan continues to claim it as part of Hokkaido Prefecture. After the Soviet occupation, Shana became part of the Kurilsky District as Kurilsk. The recorded population was 5,157 in 1989 and 3,634 in 2006.

Geography 

The municipality has an area of 973.30 square kilometres, or 375.79 square miles. It has a population of 1,426 as of 1945, with no data available after that.

Adjacent municipalities 

 Shibetoro, Shibetoro District
 Rubetsu, Etorofu District

Economy 
Shana's economy is based on fishing industry where trout, salmon and cod are the most common fish found. Whaling and algae collection are also some of its industries. Other land based industries include livestock such as grazing horses and cows, canning industry and fertilizer production.

References 

Nemuro, Hokkaido
Disputed islands